Gurie Grosu (born 1 January 1877 in Nimoreni, Bessarabia Governorate, Russian Empire – died 14 November 1943 in Bucharest, Romania) was a Bessarabian priest and the first holder of the Basarabian Metropolitan Church after 100 years of Russian occupation. His Christian name was Gheorghe, and he took the name of Gurie when became a monk. Gurie was an extremely devout man and one of the promoters of Romanianism in Bessarabia. 

When King Carol II paid a visit to Bessarabia in 1930, Metropolitan Gurie prevented him from entering the altar through the royal gates, telling him that a king can only do it with a crown on his head and with his wife Princess Elena of Greece, criticizing his extra-marital relations. The king has never forgiven this; he has created a campaign against Gurie, exaggerating what has happened before. He was accused of abuses and lack of management, being investigated by the Cassation Court, who never conducted the investigation to the end. At the press of the King, on 11 November 1936, the Holy Synod, led by Patriarch Miron Cristea, suspended him not taking into account the letter sent by him. Only the Legionnaires and a high prelate were in his defense.

Biography
Grosu was born in Nimoreni and died on 14 November 1943 in Bucharest.

Education
He studied at the Spiritual School (1888-1882) and at the Theological Seminary of Chișinău (1892-1898), then from 1898 to 1902 at the Spiritual Academy in Kiev, founded by Romanian Metropolitan Petru Movilă, where he obtained the degree of the Master of Theology.

Pedagogical and spiritual activity 
In 1902, he was ordained in the New-Neamț Monastery of Chițcani, ordained hieromonk and called "eparchial missionary" (1902), later he was ordained protocell and archimandrite (1909).  One of his merits was obtaining the establishment of an eparchial printing press (1896) "The Illuminator" in Chișinău (1908). He was the Prior at St. Abram Abbey in Smolensk (1909) and the director of the teacher-training school (normal schools) of the Gruševsk (1910-1914) and Samovka (1914-1917) and the professor of Romanian language in Chișinău (1917-1918) and the militant of Romanianism, as Deputy Minister of Justice in the Provisional Government of Chișinău. On 4 July 1918 was elected by the Holy Synod of Bucharest, as Pontiff Vicar of the Metropolitan Church of Moldova, with the title "Botoşăneanul" (ordained at Iaşi on 15 July 1918). In 1919 he was appointed Pontiff Vicar of the archiepiscopacy of Chișinău (with the title "Bălți"). On 1 January 1920 the Pontiff of Chisinau and Hotin, and on 21 February 1920, was elected as a full holder (enthroned in 1921), and from 28 April 1928 he became Metropolitan of Bessarabia, ministering by 11 November 1936, when he was retired.

Works 
 Carte de învăţătură despre legea lui Dumnezeu alcătuită după mai multe manuale ruseşti, Chişinău, 1908,  
 Bucoavnă moldovenească. Chişinău, 1909; 
 Abecedar moldovenesc Chişinău, 1917,  (în colaborare; ed. a II-a şi a III-A,cu litere latine, în 1918, ed. a VII-a în 1922), 
 Rugăciune şi lămurirea lor, Chişinău, 1920, 44 p.; 
 Despre omul “trupesc", “sufletesc" şi “duhovnicesc". Chişinău, 1924,
 Istoria sfântă a Vechiului şi Noului Testament, Chişinău, 1924, (şi alte ediţii);
 Slujirea lui Dumnezeu a unui preot bun, după Părintele loan de Cronstadt, Chişinău, 1925,

Notes

External links 
  Personalităţi marcante ale neamului - Gurie Grosu  , proiectul Moldova lui Ştefan

Romanian people of Moldovan descent
1877 births
1943 deaths
Moldovan priests
Metropolitans of Bessarabia
Burials at Cernica Monastery Cemetery